The men's 220 yards event at the 1954 British Empire and Commonwealth Games was held on 4 and 6 July at the Empire Stadium in Vancouver, Canada.

Medalists

Results

Heats
Held on 5 August

Qualification: First 2 in each heat (Q) qualify directly for the semifinals.

Semifinals
Held on 5 August

Qualification: First 3 in each heat (Q) qualify directly for the final.

Final
Held on 6 August

References

Athletics at the 1954 British Empire and Commonwealth Games
1954